Jänisjoki is a river of Finland and Russia. It begins from the territory of Finland in the province of Northern Karelia, passes into the Republic of Karelia in Russia and flows there into Lake Ladoga. It is part of the Neva River basin in Finland and Russia that flows into the Gulf of Finland in St. Petersburg, Russia.

See also
List of rivers of Finland

References

Rivers of Finland
Rivers of the Republic of Karelia
International rivers of Europe